Trécesson is a township municipality in the Canadian province of Quebec, located in the Abitibi Regional County Municipality. It encompasses the communities of Clercs-Saint-Viateur, La Ferme, Lac-Davy, Trécesson, and Villemontel.

It is part of the census agglomeration of Amos.

Demographics 

Population trend:
 Population in 2011: 1138 (2006 to 2011 population change: -4.8%)
 Population in 2006: 1195
 Population in 2001: 1177
 Population in 1996: 1145
 Population in 1991: 1061

Mother tongue:
 English as first language: 2.9%
 French as first language: 97.1%
 English and French as first language: 0%
 Other as first language: 0%

Municipal council
 Mayor: Ghislain Nadeau
 Councillors: Sébastien Constantineau, Nathalie Dion, Claude Ferland, Michel Hamelin, Patrick Lafrance, Martin Thibault

References

Township municipalities in Quebec
Incorporated places in Abitibi-Témiscamingue